Michael Anthony Figga (born July 31, 1970) is a retired catcher in Major League Baseball who played for the New York Yankees and the Baltimore Orioles. In a three-year career, Figga hit .213 with one home run.

Early life and education 

Born in Tampa, Florida, Figga attended A.P. Leto High School in Tampa, graduating in 1988.  Figga then enjoyed a short but standout career at Central Florida Community College.  Figga was drafted in 1989 by the New York Yankees. He played in the Australian Baseball League with the Canberra Bushrangers in the 1994 and 1995 seasons.

Major league career 

After a long career in the minor leagues, Figga made his major-league debut on September 16, 1997, with the Yankees.  Figga appeared in five games for the Yankees between 1997 and 1999.  His lone major-league appearance in 1998 was on September 23, 1998, when he went one-for-four and scored a run against the Cleveland Indians.  For that appearance, Figga earned a World Series ring when the Yankees won the World Series the following month.

In 1999, Figga started the season as one of three catchers on the Yankees' roster, however his mere presence caused controversy amongst the Yankee brass. Out of options, (the number of times a team is allowed to demote a player to the minor leagues without exposing him to waivers) owner George Steinbrenner ordered acting manager Don Zimmer to promote Figga to the major league roster despite offering limited opportunities to play. In fact, he saw no action at all until a doubleheader on May 22 where he was a late inning defensive replacement for both games. He never batted nor appeared in another game for the Yankees. When manager Joe Torre (who missed the first two months after being diagnosed with prostate cancer in spring training) returned,  he was able to convince Steinbrenner that he needed the roster spot more than he needed the player so Figga was waived in June 1999 and picked up by the Baltimore Orioles, and played 41 games for the Orioles.

After baseball 

From 2000 until 2004, Figga played both in the minor leagues and for the Nashua Pride in the independent Atlantic League of Professional Baseball.  He subsequently retired from baseball with an early case of the dreaded disease of catchers: bad knees.  Today, Figga now works for Republic National Distribution Company  and lives in the Tampa Bay area of Florida and recently finished coaching a little league football team called the Westchase Colts and a travel baseball team called the Tampa Bay Bulls.

References

Sources

1970 births
Living people
Albany-Colonie Diamond Dogs players
Albany-Colonie Yankees players
Albuquerque Dukes players
Allentown Ambassadors players
American expatriate baseball players in Mexico
Bakersfield Blaze players
Baltimore Orioles players
Baseball players from Tampa, Florida
Binghamton Mets players
College of Central Florida Patriots baseball players
Columbus Clippers players
Durham Bulls players
Fargo-Moorhead RedHawks players
Fort Lauderdale Yankees players
Gulf Coast Yankees players
Lincoln Saltdogs players
Major League Baseball catchers
Mexican League baseball right fielders
Nashua Pride players
New York Yankees players
Norfolk Tides players
Norwich Navigators players
Orlando Rays players
Pawtucket Red Sox players
Pericos de Puebla players
Prince William Cannons players
San Antonio Missions players
San Bernardino Spirit players
Sioux City Explorers players
Somerset Patriots players
St. Lucie Mets players
Tampa Yankees players
Trenton Thunder players
American expatriate baseball players in Australia